You Must Be Joking! is a 1965 black and white British comedy film directed by Michael Winner and starring Michael Callan, Lionel Jeffries, and Denholm Elliott.

The format of the film, four people each doing six tasks linked to a scavenger hunt, allows for 24 otherwise somewhat unconnected comedy vignettes, which jointly create the story line. The items (purportedly representing British identity) include flying ducks for the wall, an English rose, the Spirit of Ecstasy from a Rolls-Royce car, an electric hare from a greyhound race and the Lutine Bell.

Plot
Major Foskett, a British Army psychologist, assembles four soldiers for a testing task: Sergeant Major McGregor (complete with kilt and bearskin), Captain Tabasco, Sergeant Clegg (a father of nine), Staff Sergeant Mansfield and United States Air Force Lieutenant Morton. They have their initiative tested in a scavenger hunt.

Their first task is to escape a maze. Tabasco orders up a helicopter to take him out and two others take a ride, but Clegg is left in the maze.

They are instructed to obtain six items, supposedly symbols of the British way of life. The reward for the winner is to be fast-tracked for promotion and a ten-day, all-expenses-paid trip around the world for two. Among the feats to be accomplished within 48 hours are escaping from a maze, retrieving a rare rose and the mascot from a Rolls-Royce motorcar, and procurement of a lock of hair and an autograph from a popular French singer. The final challenge involves the famous Lutine bell from the Underwriting Room of Lloyd's of London. MacGregor arrives at the finish line by parachute, Tabasco comes in an ambulance, Clegg digs his way in from below. Morton arrives last (by car), but is declared the winner and resigns.

General Lockwood is arrested for misuse of the requisition system. Foskett is arrested for conspiracy to steal the Lutine Bell.

Cast
 Michael Callan - Lieutenant Timothy Morton
 Lionel Jeffries - Sergeant Major Sidney McGregor
 Denholm Elliott - Captain Fitzroy Tabasco
 Wilfrid Hyde-White - General Lockwood
 Bernard Cribbins - Sergeant Clegg
 Terry-Thomas - Major Foskett
 James Robertson Justice - Librarian
 Gabriella Licudi - Annabelle Nash
 Leslie Phillips - Young husband, Mr Walters
 Gwendolyn Watts - Young wife, Mrs (Ducks) Walters
 Patricia Viterbo - Sylvie Tarnet a pop singer
 Lee Montague - Staff Sergeant Mansfield
 Irene Handl - Elderly Woman
 Richard Wattis - Parkins
 Miles Malleson - Salesman
 Clive Dunn - Doorman at Tv Studio
 Tracy Reed - Poppy Pennington
 James Villiers - Bill Simpson
 Graham Stark - McGregor's Suez comrade
 Ronald Howard - Cecil
 Arthur Lowe - Husband
 Joan Benham - Wife
 Lance Percival - Shifty Man
 Peter Bull - Ferocious Man in Library
 Peter Barkworth - Recording Studio Manager
 Norman Vaughan - Norman Stone
 Jon Pertwee - Greyhound Stadium storeman
 Peter Gilmore - Private (gardening duty in greenhouse)
 Ed Bishop - US Air Force Soldier at Checkpoint - (uncredited)
 Richard Caldicot - M.O.D. official - (uncredited)
 Damaris Hayman - Fan Club Employee - (uncredited)
 John Horsley - Lloyd's Director - (uncredited)
 Victor Brooks - commissionaire - (uncredited)
 Peter Barkworth - Television Studio Director - (uncredited)
 Dave Watts keyboards - Ricky Ticky Taylor Pop Star

Production
The film was based on an original story by Michael Winner which was inspired by a real army initiative test where soldiers were asked to get as far away as possible from their camp at Catterick. He hired Alan Hackney, who had written several Boulting Brothers screenplays, to write the script.

While looking for finance, Winner was approached to make a film with the Dave Clark Five, but Winner did not like the idea. Charles H. Schneer liked the Hackney script and agreed to make it under a deal he had with Columbia and Winner says he suggested John Boorman take over the Dave Clark movie. Winner said Columbia insisted that Michael Callan play a lead role. Winner called the actor "a nice fellow who didn't sell the film in America and didn't help it in England either."

Winner hired a cameraman who felt they could not film in the locations that had been chosen, so Winner replaced him with Geoff Unsworth. Johnny Speight did some uncredited writing on the film.

Reception
Winner says the film received good reviews but was not popular at the box office.

TV Guide called the film: "Lunacy and laughs galore, with director Winner's gimmicky style much in evidence."
 Hal Erickson wrote in The New York Times: "Director Michael Winner was still in his 'mad mod' period when he lensed the wacky goings-on of You Must be Joking? His Death Wish pictures of the 1970s were in 1965 as remote as another galaxy."

References

External links

1965 films
1965 comedy films
British comedy films
1960s English-language films
Films directed by Michael Winner
Films scored by Laurie Johnson
Films set in England
Films set in London
Films shot in London
Military humor in film
Films produced by Charles H. Schneer
Films with screenplays by Michael Winner
Films about the British Army
Greyhound racing films
1960s British films